12 Regiment RLC was a regiment of the British Army's Royal Logistic Corps.

History 
From its formation in 2006 to its disbandment in 2013 the regiment was a logistic support regiment for the 4th Mechanized Brigade.  In September 2012 the regiment deployed to Afghanistan as the Close Support Logistic Regiment on Herrick 17.  During its six-month tour the regiment was tasked as a Combat Logistic Patrol.

Structure 
Organization of the regiment;

 25 Headquarters Squadron
 6 Close Support Squadron
 11 General Support Squadron
 43 Close Support Squadron
 Royal Electrical and Mechanical Engineers Light Aid Detachment

References 

Regiments of the Royal Logistic Corps
Military units and formations established in 2006